Un is the eleventh studio album  by English rock band Chumbawamba, released on 8 June 2004 by Koch Records. The album was written and produced by solely by Chumbawamba. A musical departure from predecessor Readymades (2002), the album incorporates elements of folk, electronic, and world music. Thematically, the album acts as a social commentary on a variety of political and social issues, including individualism and anti-consumerism. Un was promoted with two singles: "The Wizard of Menlo Park" and "On eBay".

Track listing 

Notes
 "The Wizard of Menlo Park" contains a sample of "Mary Had a Little Lamb", as recited by Thomas Edison.
 "Just Desserts" contains a sampled excerpt from a 1997 Des Moines press conference featuring Anita Bryant.

Personnel
 Alice Nutter – vocals
 Jude Abbott – trumpet, vocals
 Dunstan Bruce – vocals
 Louise Watts – vocals, keyboards
 Boff – guitar, vocals
 Neil Ferguson – bass, vocals
 Harry Hamer – drums, vocals
 Danbert Nobacon – vocals

with
 Andy Cutting – diatonic accordion
 Gill Pearson – violin
 Justin Sullivan – mouth organ

References

Un (album)
2004 albums